The Roman Catholic Archdiocese of Avignon (Latin: Archidioecesis Avenionensis; French: Archidiocèse d'Avignon) is an archdiocese of the Latin Church of the Roman Catholic Church in France. The diocese exercises jurisdiction over the territory embraced by the department of Vaucluse, in the Region of Provence-Alpes-Côte d'Azur. The diocese has been led since January 2021 by Archbishop Georges Pontier, whom Pope Francis called out of retirement to serve as Apostolic Administrator.

Established in the 4th century as the Diocese of Avignon, the diocese was elevated to an archdiocese in 1475, with the suffragan sees of the Diocese of Carpentras, the Diocese of Vaison, and the Diocese of Cavaillon. By the Concordat of 1801 these three dioceses were united to Avignon, together with the Diocese of Apt, a suffragan of the Archdiocese of Aix. At the same time, however, Avignon was reduced to the rank of a bishopric and was made a suffragan see of Aix.

The Archdiocese of Avignon was re-established in 1822, and received as suffragan sees the Diocese of Viviers (restored in 1822); Diocese of Valence (formerly under Lyon); Diocese of Nîmes (restored in 1822); and Diocese of Montpellier (formerly under Toulouse).

On 16 December 2002, the see – officially Archdiocese of Avignon (-Apt, Cavaillon, Carpentras, Orange, and Vaison)  – lost its Metropolitan status and became instead a suffragan see of Marseille. In 2009 its name was changed to Archdiocese of Avignon, the secondary titles being suppressed.

History

There is no evidence that either Saint Rufus, disciple of Saint Paul according to certain traditions the son of Simon of Cyrene, or Saint Justus, likewise held in high honour throughout the territory of Avignon, was venerated in antiquity as bishop of that see. The first bishop known to history is Nectarius, who took part in several councils about the middle of the fifth century. Saint Agricol (Agricolus), bishop between 650 and 700, is the patron saint of Avignon.

In 1475 Pope Sixtus IV raised the diocese of Avignon to the rank of an archbishopric, in favour of his nephew Giuliano della Rovere who later became Pope Julius II.

Bishops

To 1000

 ? - 100: Saint Simon of Cyrene
 3rd of 4th century: Saint Ruf
 439–451: Nectarius
 465: Saturinus
 475–507: Julianus
 524–540: Eucherius
 541–554: Antonius 
 585: Johannes
 618: Maximus
 7th century: Saint Veredème
 7th century (683?): Saint Agricol
 855: Ragenutius
 860–876: Hilduinus
 876–879: Ratifridus

1000 to 1474

mentioned 1002: Pierre
before 1006–1033: Heldebert
1033–1036: Senioret
1037– after 1047: Benoît I
before 1050– after 1173: Rostaing II
1095– after 1120: Albert
before 1124–1142: Laugerius
1148–after 1148: Geoffroy I
1173–1174: Raymond I
1174–1177: Geoffroy II
1178–1180: Pontius
1180–1197: Rostaing III de Marguerite
1197–1209: Rostaing IV
1209–1216 death: Guillaume I de Montelier
mentioned 1225: Pierre II
before 1226– after 1230: Nicolas de Corbie
mentioned 1238: Benedictus
1242–1261 death: Zoen Tencarari
1264–1266: Bertrand de Saint-Martin
1267– c. 1287 death: Robert d'Uzès
mentioned 1288: Benoît III
1290– after 1294: André de Languiscel
1300–1310: Bertrandus Aymini
1310–1312: Jacques Duèze, later Pope John XXII
1313–1317: Jacques de Via (nephew of John XXII)
1317–1334: John XXII (again)
1336–1349: Jean de Cojordan
1349–1352 death: Clement VI
1352–1362 death: Innocent VI
1362–1366: Anglicus Grimoard (brother Pope Urban V)
1366–1367: Urban V
1367–1368: Philippe de Cabassole
1368–1371 death: Pierre d'Aigrefeuille
1371–1383: Faydit d'Aigrefeuille
1391–1394: Clement VII (antipope)
1394–1398: Benedict XIII (antipope)
1398–1406: Gilles de Bellamere
1410–1412: Pierre V de Tourroye
1412–1415: Simond de Cramaud
1415–1419: Guy I de Roussillon-Bouchage
1419–1422: Guy II Spifame
1422–1432: Guy III de Roussillon-Bouchage
1432–1433: Marco Condulmer
1437–1474: Alain de Coëtivy

Archbishops

1474–1503: Giuliano della Rovere (Archbishop from 1475)
1503–1512: Antoine Florès
1512–1517: Orlando Carretto della Rovere (Orland de Roure)
1517–1535: Hippolyte de' Medici
1535–1551: Alessandro Farnese the Younger
1551–1562: Annibale Bozzuti (Annibal Buzzutto)
1566–1576: Félicien Capitone
1577–1585: Georges d'Armagnac
1585–1592: Domenico Grimaldi
1592–1598: François-Marie Thaurusi (Francesco Maria Tarugi)
1598–1609: Jean-François Bordini
1609–1624: Etienne II Dulci
1624–1644: Marius Philonardi
1644–1647: Bernard III Pinelli
1647–1649: César Argelli
1649–1669: Domenico de' Marini
1669–1672: Azzo Ariosto
1673–1686: Hyacinthe Libelli
1686–1689: Alexandre II Montecatini
1690–1705: Lorenzo Fieschi
1705–1717: François Maurice Gonteri 
1742–1757: Joseph Guyon de Crochans
1757–1775: François Maria Manzi
1775–1790: Carlo Vincenzo Giovio
1793–1794: François-Régis Rovère
1798: François Etienne
1802–1817: Jean-François Périer
1821–1830: Etienne-Parfait-Martin Maurel de Mons
1831–1834: Louis-Joseph d'Humières
1834–1842: Célestin Dupont (Jacques-Marie-Antoine-Célestin du Pont) (also Archbishop of Bourges)
1842–1848: Paul Naudo
1848–1863: Jean-Marie-Mathias Debelay
1863–1880: Louis-Anne Dubreuil

1880–1884: François-Edouard Hasley (also Archbishop of Cambrai)
1885–1895: Louis-Joseph-Marie-Ange Vigne
1896–1907: Louis-François Sueur
1907–1928: Gaspard-Marie-Michel-André Latty
1928–1957: Gabriel-Roch de Llobet
1957–1970: Joseph-Martin Urtasun
1970–1978: Eugène-Jean-Marie Polge
1978–2002: Raymond Bouchex
2002–2021: Jean-Pierre Marie Cattenoz
2021–present: François Fonlupt

See also
 Catholic Church in France
 List of Catholic dioceses in France
 Timeline of Avignon

Notes

References

Sources

Further reading

External links

 Official site of the Diocese of Avignon
 Diocese of Avignon on the website of the Église catholique en France

Avignon
 
Avignon Papacy